Hisham Kamel Abbas Mahmood Algakh is an Egyptian poet who has worked to make Egyptian poetry more accessible to young people and children.

Algakh has written more than 55 poems, most of which are written in an informal Egyptian dialect. All of his poems are spoken. He published his first collection of poems, "al-dīwān al-awwal" in Cairo International Book Fair in 2017.

Algakh has read his poetry in numerous concert events in the Middle East, North Africa and Western Europe.

Early years 
 Algakh was born on 1st 1978 October in the governorate Sohag, Egypt. His family came upper Egypt with Kenawy roots. He belongs to Al Houwara tribe, in Abu Tesht in governorate Qena. 
 Algakh studied in Sohag then obtained his bachelor's degree in business at Ain Shams University in 2003. He was appointed supervisor on Ain Shams University cultural office on graduation. Algakh received his master's degree in business administration from the same university in 2007
 Algakh resigned from Ain Shams in 2009 to work solely on his poetry. He was named the best young colloquial poet by the Egyptian writers union in 2008. He won second place in the Prince of Poets contest in Abu Dhabi in 2011.

Literary career 
 Algakh is also known for his poetry parties, blend music with poetry and rhythmic movements on stage.
 Algakh's poems in the formal and informal Egyptian language, which became popular due to his ongoing presence in Arab media, These poems include some of which are: (al-ta'shīrah), (Juḥā((away bi-ghayr), (Īzīs), (Khirfān((ākhar mā horref fī al-Tawrāh), (matzaʻalish), (Tabaʻan ma saletish al-ʻAshā((al-jadwal), (Mashhad raʼsī min Mīdān al-Taḥrīr). Algakh's poem "Al Madfara", contains parts in formal language and others in informal.
 He performed his first Jamahiriya poetic event, with music,in 2010,in El Sawy Culture Wheel. By 2016, he had performed Jamahiriya Poetic events in all the Egyptian states.
 Algakh published his first collection of poems in Cairo International Book Fair in 2017 under the name "al-dīwān al-awwal".

Poems 
 A'auad.
 Luqaṭah al-Firāq raqm 105.
 Tabaʻan ma saletish al-ʻAshā.
 Khamsah al-ṣubḥ.
 Ḥamzah
 al-mukālamah.
 Anā Ikhwān.
 Malik al-niḥal.
 24 shāriʻ al-Ḥijāz.
 ikhtilāf.
 -ākhar mā horref fī al-Tawrāh.
 Īzīs.
 al-ta'shīrah.
 3 Khirfān.
 Rithāʼ juairia.
 al-jadwal.
 Mazhoum yā Qatr al-ghalbānin.
 Mamadetish ‘idi lahadd.
 ʻalá dhikr Āl al-Nabī.

Jamahiriya concerts 
The poet Hisham Algakh performed many Jamahiriya parties in poetry nights, conventions, festivals, universities all over the Middle East region.

He has also performed in Brussels in Belgium,
Geneva in Switzerland,
Vienna in Austria, and
Paris in France.

Festivals

Television appearances 
In Ramadan 2010, Algakh had his own segment on Egyptian television, on the show "Yes'ed Sabahak". The segment was called "qoūl ya Hawīs". Every day, he would read his poems with the tunes of the oud playing as his background music. The list of some of his most important television appearances:

 In the show "Re7t 2lbon" which aired on the channel "Blue Nile TV" the poet hosted the show in 2014, where he presented 10 episodes that aired in Ramadan.

Prizes and honors 
 F.I.P.Arts in Tunisia.
 Hala Feb Festival - Tuesday Feb 9, 2016.
 Festival De La Joie Africaine in the city of Douz – south Tunisia.
 He was honored in 7 Jamahiriya parties in 7 different Algerian states.
 Best young colloquial poet from the Egyptian writers union in 2008.
 He won second place in the Prince of Poets contest in Abu Dhabi in 2011.

External links 
Jamahiria

References 

 صفحة الشاعر على السينما دوت كوم. نسخة محفوظة 19 أبريل 2016 على موقع واي باك مشين.
 (بالتفاصيل: حفل توقيع الديوان الأول لهشام الجخ بمعرض الكتاب - الموقع الرسمي للشاعر هشام جخ" (باللغة الانجليزية 
 الموقع الرسمي للشاعر، عن هشام. نسخة محفوظة 6 يونيو 2017 على موقع واي باك مشين.

Living people
1978 births
Egyptian poets
People from Sohag Governorate